In descriptive set theory, specifically invariant descriptive set theory, countable Borel relations are a class of relations between standard Borel space which are particularly well behaved. This concept encapsulates various more specific concepts, such as that of a hyperfinite equivalence relation, but is of interest in and of itself.

Motivation 
A main area of study in invariant descriptive set theory is the relative complexity of equivalence relations. An equivalence relation  on a set  is considered more complex than an equivalence relation  on a set  if one can "compute  using " - formally, if there is a function  which is well behaved in some sense (for example, one often requires that  is Borel measurable) such that . Such a function  If this holds in both directions, that one can both "compute  using " and "compute  using ", then  and  have a similar level of complexity.

Countable Borel equivalence relations, and relations of similar complexity in the sense described above, appear in various places in mathematics (see examples below, and see   for more). In particular, the Feldman-Moore theorem described below proved useful in the study of certain Von Neumann algebras (see ).

Definition 
Let  and  be standard Borel spaces.

Examples 
 A countable union of countable Borel relations is also a countable Borel relation.
The converse relation of the graph, is a countable Borel relation if and only if  is Borel measurable and has countable fibers.
 If  is an equivalence relation, it is a countable Borel relation if and only if it is a Borel set and all equivalence classes are countable. In particular hyperfinite equivalence relations are countable Borel relations.
 The equivalence relation induced by the continuous action of a countable group is a countable Borel relation. The equivalence relation  is then a countable Borel relation.
 Let  be the space of subsets of the naturals, again with the product topology (a basic open set is of the form   or ) - this is known as the Cantor space. The equivalence relation of Turing equivalence is a countable Borel equivalence relation. 
 The isomorphism equivalence relation between various classes of models, while not being countable Borel equivalence relations, are of similar complexity to a Borel equivalence relation in the sense described above. Examples include:
 The class of countable graphs where the degree of each vertex is finite.
 The class field extensions of finite transcendence degree over the rationals.

The Luzin-Novikov Theorem 
This theorem, named after Nikolai Luzin and his doctoral student Pyotr Novikov, is an important result used is many proofs about countable Borel relations.

Theorem.

This has a couple of easy consequences:

 Assume   is a Borel equivalence relation on a standard Borel space  which has countable equivalence classes.
Below are two more results which can be proven using the Luzin-Novikov Novikov theorem, concerning countable Borel equivalence relations:

Feldman-Moore Theorem 
The Feldman-Moore theorem, named after Jacob Feldman and Calvin C. Moore, states:

Theorem. Suppose   is a Borel equivalence relation on a standard Borel space  which has countable equivalence classes.

That is to say, countable Borel equivalence relations are exactly those generated by Borel actions by countable groups.

Marker Lemma 
This lemma is due to Theodore Slaman and John R. Steel, and can be proven using the Feldman-Moore theorem:

Lemma. Suppose   is a Borel equivalence relation on a standard Borel space  which has countable equivalence classes. Let .

Less formally, the lemma says that the infinite equivalence classes can be approximated by "arbitrarily small" set (for instance, if we have a Borel probability measure  on  the lemma implies that  by the continuity of the measure).

References 

Descriptive set theory
Binary relations